Simone Keller (born 23 March 1980) is a Swiss pianist.

Keller studied piano at the Zurich School of Music and Theater under the tutelage of Hans-Jürg Strub and graduated 2006 with a concert diploma.

She attended various master classes with Andrzej Jasinski, Siegfried Mauser, Karl Engel, Hartmut Höll and Werner Bärtschi.

Keller has received various prizes and awards including 1st prize at the Landolt Piano Competition in Zurich, 2nd prize at the Hans-Ninck Piano Competition in Winterthur and the Chamber Music Prize for Lieder Accompaniment at the European Classical Festival in Germany.

Simone Keller works as an interpreter with emphasis on contemporary music. Various composers have already written pieces for her and she develops her interpretations in collaboration with the composers.

She works with a lot of renowned musicians, actors and artists.
She founded the ensembleTZARA and initiated the Weinfelder Musikfestival in Switzerland.

Since 2008 she is the artistic director of the gallery hntrbrg in Zurich (CH).

External links 
homepage: 
musinfo:

1980 births
Living people
Swiss pianists
Swiss male musicians
Swiss women pianists
21st-century pianists
21st-century male musicians
21st-century women pianists